The Lincoln County Regiment was a local militia in Lincoln County, North Carolina during the American Revolutionary.  It was created by the North Carolina General Assembly of 1778 on February 8, 1779 at the same time that Lincoln County was created from part of Tryon County.  The Tryon County Regiment from which the Lincoln County Regiment was created was abolished upon creation of the Lincoln County Regiment.  The Lincoln County Regiment was initially subordinate to the Salisbury District Brigade. It was re-subordinated to the newly created Morgan District Brigade in may of 1782, where it was active till the end of the war.

Officers
The following were the officers in the Lincoln County Regiment:
Commanders:
 Col. William Graham (1779-1781)
 Col. Charles McLean (1779-1783)
 Col. Joseph Dickson (1781-183)

Known Lt Colonels:
 Lt. Col. William Erwin
 Lt. Col. Frederick Hambright
 Lt. Col. John Barber
Lt. Col. William Davenport
 Lt. Col. Daniel McKisick
 Lt. Col. Robert Smith

Known Majors:
 Maj. Joseph Dickson
 Maj. Francis McCorkle
 Maj. John Barber
 Maj. John Carruth
 Maj. William Chronicle
 Maj. Joseph Graham
 Maj. Jonathan Gullick
 Maj. James Johnson
 Maj. Daniel McKisick
 Maj. Tutt

Known Commissaries:
 Joseph Henry, Commisasry and Wagon Master
 Thomas McGee, Assistant Commissary
 Adolph Reep, Commissary

Known Captains

Robert Alexander
William Armstrong
James Baird
John Baldridge
John Barber
James Blackwell
Hugh Blair
Samuel Caldwell
William Caldwell
John Carruth
William Chronicle
John Clark
Joseph Collins
John Cook
John Culbertson
John Philip Dellinger
James Duff
Samuel Espey
Abraham Forney
Peter Forney
Nicholas Friday
William Frisal
John Garrett
William Graham
John Hardin Hambright
John Hazzleburger
Malcolm Henry
James Holland
William Hutchison
James Johnson
William Johnston
Thomas Lofton
Frank Long
James Lytle
Josiah Martin
Samuel Martin
Charles Mattocks
John Mattocks
Francis McCorkle
Joseph McDonnell
Thomas McGee
Daniel McKisick
John Mills
Jacob Mooney
John Moore
William Moore
James Morrison
John Murray
Joseph Neal
Benjamin Newton
Ephraim Perkins
Adam Reep
Taylor W. Richardson
John Robinson
William Sherrill
Martin Shuford from Family Genealogy Records
Peter Sides
George Smith
William Stewart
William Tabor
Lee Taylor
John Walker
John Weir
Isaac White
Thomas White
Henry Whitener
John Work

History
Known engagements during the American Revolution include:

See also
 Salisbury District Brigade

References

 , Lincoln Financial Foundation Collection
 
 

North Carolina militia
Lincoln County, North Carolina